Theta Cancri, Latinised from θ Cancri, is a multiple star system in the zodiac constellation of Cancer. It is visible to the naked eye as a dim point of light with an apparent visual magnitude of +5.32. The system is located at a distance of approximately 450 light-years away from the Sun, based on parallax, and is drifting further away with a radial velocity of +44 km/s. Since it is near the ecliptic, it can be occulted by the Moon and, very rarely, by planets.

The primary, designated component A, is K-type giant star with a stellar classification of K5 III, having exhausted the supply of hydrogen at its core, then cooled and expanded. At present it has 40 times the girth of the Sun.

In Chinese astronomy, Ghost refers to an asterism consisting of Theta Cancri, Eta Cancri, Gamma Cancri and Delta Cancri. Theta Cancri is the first star of Ghost, as it is also the determinative star for that asterism.

References

K-type giants
Double stars
Spectroscopic binaries

Cancri, Theta
Cancer (constellation)
BD+18 1963
Cancri, 31
072094
041822
3357